Valamdeh (also Romanized as Valāmdeh and Volāmadeh) is a village in Zarem Rud Rural District, Hezarjarib District, Neka County, Mazandaran Province, Iran.

It is located in the Alborz (Elburz) mountain range.

At the 2006 census, its population was 636, in 144 families.

References 

Populated places in Neka County
Settled areas of Elburz